Daqing Wan (born 1964 in China) is a Chinese mathematician working in the United States. He received his Ph.D.
from the University of Washington in Seattle in 1991, under the direction of Neal Koblitz. Since 1997, he has been on
the faculty of mathematics at the University of California at Irvine; he has also held visiting positions at the Institute for Advanced Study in Princeton, New Jersey, Pennsylvania State University, the University of Rennes, the Mathematical Sciences Research Institute in Berkeley, California, and the Chinese Academy of Sciences in Beijing.

His primary interests include number theory and arithmetic algebraic geometry, particularly zeta functions over finite fields. He is known for his proof of Dwork's conjecture  
that the p-adic unit root zeta function attached to a family of varieties over a finite field of characteristic p is p-adic meromorphic.
 
 

He received the Morningside Silver Medal of mathematics in 2001.

See also

Carlitz–Wan conjecture
Dwork conjecture

References

External links
 Wan's home page at UCI

1964 births
Living people
Mathematicians from Chongqing
20th-century Chinese mathematicians
21st-century Chinese mathematicians
University of Washington alumni
University of California, Irvine faculty
Chinese emigrants to the United States
Place of birth missing (living people)
Sichuan University alumni
Educators from Chongqing
Chinese science writers
Writers from Chongqing